Affan Waheed is a Pakistani television actor, model and RJ. He is best known for his roles as Musaf in Aik Pal (2014), Atif in Khamoshi (2017), Shafay in Bay Dardi (2018), and as Badar in Do Bol (2019). Waheed will also be seen in 2020 film Mastaani.

Early life
The third of four siblings, Waheed was born in Karachi where his father, from the Pakistan Air Force, was stationed. Because of his father's military career, the family moved a lot and he grew up in different cities (Gujranwala, Islamabad and Sargodha), and eventually settled in Lahore.

Career
A graduate of the National College of Arts, he made his transition from painting to acting in 2006 with a role in Tere Pehlu Mein, and apart from painting and acting, he also writes Urdu poetry and keeps an interest in music as a singer as well.

Filmography

Film

Television

References

External links 
 
 

1984 births
Living people
People from Karachi
Pakistani male television actors
Male actors from Karachi
National College of Arts alumni